The 2018 America East Conference women's soccer tournament was the postseason women's soccer tournament for the America East Conference held from October 25 through November 4, 2018. The five-match tournament took place at campus sites, with the higher seed hosting. The six-team single-elimination tournament consisted of three rounds based on seeding from regular season conference play. The defending champions were the Stony Brook Seawolves, who were unable to defend their title after losing in the Quarterfinals to UMass Lowell.  Albany won their third tournament in 4 years after a 5–1 victory in the final.

Bracket

Schedule

Quarterfinals

Semifinals

Final

Statistics

Goalscorers 
2 Goals
 Jasmine Colbert - Albany
 Lily Fabian - Stony Brook
Mariah Williams - Albany

1 Goal
 Meghan Cavanaugh - Albany
 Christina Cernuto - Albany
 Jada Colbert - Albany
 Katelyn Vieira - Stony Brook

See also 
 2018 America East Men's Soccer Tournament

References 

 
America East Conference Women's Soccer Tournament